In the history of the Low Countries, the Burgundian Netherlands or the Burgundian Age is the period between 1384 and 1482, during which a growing part of the Low Countries was ruled by the Dukes of Burgundy. Within their Burgundian State, which itself belonged partly to the Holy Roman Empire and partly to the Kingdom of France, the dukes united these lowlands into a political union that went beyond a personal union as it gained central institutions for the first time (such as the States General).

The period began with Duke Philip the Bold taking office as count of Flanders and Artois in 1384 and lasted until the death of Duchess Mary of Burgundy in 1482 after which the Burgundian State was dissolved, and the Low Countries came under the rule of the Habsburg monarchy by inheritance.

In the 15th century, it was customary to refer to the Low Countries where the Duke of Burgundy ruled and usually resided as les pays de par-deçà meaning "the lands over here" as opposed to Burgundy proper (in Central France) which was designated les pays de par-delà meaning "the lands over there" (see also Terminology of the Low Countries).

History

A fair share (but not most) of these territories were inherited by the Burgundian dukes, a younger branch of the French royal House of Valois, upon the death of Count Louis II of Flanders in 1384. His heiress, Margaret III of Flanders in 1369 had married Philip the Bold, youngest son of King John II of France and the first of the Valois dukes of Burgundy at Dijon, who thus inherited the County of Flanders. The Flemish comital House of Dampierre had been French vassals, who held territory around the affluent cities of Bruges and Ghent, but also adjacent lands in former Lower Lorraine east of the Scheldt river ("Imperial Flanders") including the exclave of Mechelen, which were a fief of the Holy Roman Empire, and furthermore the neighbouring French County of Artois. Together they initiated an era of Burgundian governance in the Low Countries.

The Dampierre legacy further comprised the French counties of Rethel in northern Champagne and Nevers west of Burgundy proper, both held by Philip's younger son Philip II from 1407, as well as the County of Burgundy (Franche-Comté) east of it, an Imperial fief which had been part of the former Kingdom of Burgundy-Arles.

In the following decades, the Burgundian dukes expanded their territories in the Low Countries by the acquisition of several Imperial States: Duke Philip the Good purchased the County of Namur in 1421, inherited the Duchies of Brabant and Limburg in 1430, and seized the Counties of Hainaut, Holland and Zeeland in 1432, and the Duchy of Luxembourg in 1441. His son, the last Burgundian duke Charles the Bold, in 1473 annexed the Duchy of Guelders, which had been pawned by late Arnold of Egmond.

The Valois era would last until 1477, when Duke Charles the Bold died at the Battle of Nancy leaving no male heir. The territorial Duchy of Burgundy reverted to the French crown according to Salic law, and King Louis XI of France also seized the French portion of the Burgundian possessions in the Low Countries. The Imperial fiefs passed to the Austrian House of Habsburg through Charles' daughter Mary of Burgundy and her husband Archduke Maximilian of Habsburg, son of Emperor Frederick III. Maximilian however regarded the Burgundian Netherlands including Flanders and Artois as the undivided domains of his wife and himself and marched against the French. The conflict culminated at the Battle of Guinegate in 1479. Though Maximilian was victorious, he was only able to gain the County of Flanders according to the 1482 Treaty of Arras after his wife Mary had suddenly died, while France retained Artois.

In her testament, Mary of Burgundy had bequested the Burgundian heritage to her and Maximilian's son, Philip the Handsome. His father, dissatisfied with the terms of the Arras agreement, continued to contest the seized French territories. In 1493, King Charles VIII of France according to the Treaty of Senlis finally renounced Artois, which together with Flanders was incorporated into the Imperial Seventeen Provinces under the rule of Philip.

Demographics
The population of the main provinces of the Low Countries in 1477 (Prince-Bishoprics in italic).

Rulers
The Burgundian dukes who ruled the Burgundian territories were:

House of Valois, territorial Dukes of Burgundy
Philip the Bold (1384–1404), son of King John II of France, by his wife Margaret III of Flanders
John the Fearless (1404–1419), son
Philip the Good (1419–1467), son
Charles the Bold (1467–1477), son

House of Valois, titular Duchess of Burgundy
Mary of Burgundy (1477–1482), Charles' daughter, married Maximilian I of Habsburg in 1477

House of Habsburg, titular Dukes of Burgundy (see Habsburg Netherlands)
Philip the Handsome (1482–1506), Mary's son; Maximilian I, his father, as regent (1482–1493), Margaret of York, his step-grandmother, governess (1489-1493)
Charles V (1506–1555), Philip's son; Margaret of Austria, regent (1507–1515) and (1519–1530)

Political

The sheer burden of variety of bishoprics and independent cities, the intensely local partisanship, the various taxation systems, weights and measures, internal customs barriers, fiercely defended local rights were all hindrances to a "good Valois". Attempts at enlarging personal control by the dukes resulted in revolts among the independent towns (sometimes supported by independent local nobles) and bloody military suppression in response. An increasingly modernized central government, with a bureaucracy of clerks, allowed the dukes to become celebrated art patrons and establish a glamorous court life that gave rise to conventions of behavior that lasted for centuries. Philip the Good (1419–1467) extended his personal control to the southeast; bringing Brussels, Namur, and Liège under his control. He channeled the traditional independence of the cities through such mechanisms as the first Estates-General, and consolidating of the region's economy.

The first Estates General of the Burgundian territories met in the City Hall of Bruges on 9 January 1464. It included delegates from the Duchy of Brabant, the County of Flanders, Lille, Douai and Orchies, the County of Artois, the County of Hainaut, the County of Holland, the County of Zeeland, the County of Namur, the Lordship of Mechelen, and the Boulonnais. Up to 1464, the Duke only maintained ties with each of the provincial States separately. In principle, the provincial Estates were composed of representatives of the three traditional estates: clergy, nobility and the Third Estate, but the exact composition and influence of each estate (within the provincial Estates) could differ. Convening an Estates General in which all provincial Estates were represented was part of Philip the Good's policy of centralisation.

Ducal patronage
From 1441, Philip based his ducal court in Brussels, but Bruges was the world center of commerce, though by the 1480s the inevitable silting of its harbor was bringing its economic hegemony to a close. Philip was a great patron of illuminated manuscripts and court painting reached new highs: Robert Campin, the famous Van Eyck brothers, and Rogier van der Weyden

Social and economic
In 1491 and 1492, the peasants revolted in some areas. They were suppressed by Maximilian's forces under the command of Duke Albert of Saxony at a battle at Heemskerk.

"Burgundian character"

In the present-day Netherlands, inhabitants of the culturally Catholic area of Meierij van 's-Hertogenbosch are considered by the other Dutch to have a Burgundian character, meaning that they are supposed to be companionable people who like to party exuberantly.

See also  
 Burgundian inheritance in the Low Countries

References

Notes

Bibliography

Stein, Robert. 2017. Magnanimous Dukes and Rising States: The Unification of the Burgundian Netherlands, 1380-1480. Oxford University Press.

External links
Metropolitan Museum: "Burgundian Netherlands: Court Life
Metropolitan Museum: "Burgundian Netherlands: Private Life

 
History of the Low Countries
Former monarchies of Europe
Former polities in the Netherlands
14th century in Belgium
15th century in Belgium
15th century in the Netherlands
15th century in Luxembourg
States and territories established in 1384
States and territories disestablished in 1482

1384 establishments in Europe
1480s disestablishments in Europe
1380s establishments in the Holy Roman Empire
1480s disestablishments in the Holy Roman Empire